Clarksville is the name of some places in the U.S. state of New Jersey:

Clarksville, Hunterdon County, New Jersey
Clarksville, Mercer County, New Jersey

See also
Clarksville (disambiguation)